The Neo-Aramaic or Modern Aramaic languages are varieties of Aramaic that evolved during the late medieval and early modern periods, and continue to the present day as vernacular (spoken) languages of modern Aramaic-speaking communities. Within the field of Aramaic studies, classification of Neo-Aramaic languages has been a subject of particular interest among scholars, who proposed several divisions, into two (western and eastern), three (western, central and eastern) or four (western, central, northeastern and southeastern) primary groups.

In terms of sociolinguistics, Neo-Aramaic languages are also classified by various ethnolinguistic and religiolinguistic criteria, spanning across ethnic and religious lines, and encompassing groups that adhere to Christianity, Judaism, Mandeism and Islam.

Christian Neo-Aramaic languages have long co-existed with Classical Syriac as a literary and liturgical language of Syriac Christianity. Since Classical Syriac and similar archaic forms, like Targumic Aramaic (old Judeo-Aramaic variety) and Classical Mandaic, are no longer vernacular, they are not classified as Neo-Aramaic languages. However, the classical languages continue to have influence over the colloquial Neo-Aramaic languages.

The most prominent Neo-Aramaic varieties belong to Central Neo-Aramaic and Northeastern Neo-Aramaic groups. They are spoken primarily (though not wholly exclusively) by ethnic Assyrians, who are adherents of the Assyrian Church of the East, Ancient Church of the East, Syriac Orthodox Church, Chaldean Catholic Church, and some other denominations. Other speakers include Christians from the Levant who speak the endangered Western Neo-Aramaic, Mandeans, and some Mizrahi Jews. Today, the number of fluent Neo-Aramaic speakers is significantly smaller, and newer generations of Assyrians generally are not acquiring the full language, especially as many have emigrated and acculturated into their new resident countries, and other minority Aramaic languages are being surpassed by local majority languages.

History

During the Late Antiquity, and throughout the Middle Ages, linguistic development of Aramaic language was marked by coexistence of literary and vernacular forms. Dominant literary form among Aramaic-speaking Christians was Edessan Aramaic (Urhaya), that came to be known as Classical Syriac (term coined by western scholars). In the same time, Aramaic-speaking Jews had their own literary languages (Judeo-Aramaic languages). Along with dominant literary forms, various vernacular forms were also spoken, with distinctive regional variations. By the late medieval period, literary forms used by Aramaic-speaking Christians were confided mainly to the religious sphere of life (liturgical use), while vernacular forms continued to develop into the early modern period. Gradually, some of those Neo-Aramaic vernacular forms also started to be used for literary purposes.

During the 19th century, first systematic studies of Neo-Aramaic languages were initiated, and by the beginning of the 20th century some Neo-Aramaic varieties already entered into the modern phase of their linguistic development, marked by the appearance of various Neo-Aramaic publications, and also by the establishment of modern schools and other institutions.

That development was severely interrupted by the breakout of the First World War (1914–1918) and the atrocities committed against Aramaic-speaking communities during the Seyfo (genocide). Displacement of many communities from their native regions disrupted the linguistic continuum, and also created new groups of Neo-Aramaic speakers throughout diaspora. Those events had a profound impact on further development of Neo-Aramaic communities, affecting all spheres of life, including various cultural issues related to their language.

Varieties

Throughout the history of Aramaic language, a dialectal boundary dividing western and eastern varieties has existed, running transversely across the Syrian Desert from southeast to northwest.

The other Neo-Aramaic languages are all eastern varieties, but with little homogeneity. Most distinct in this group is Modern Mandaic, which has low intelligibility with other varieties. It is the direct descendant of Classical Mandaic, which traces its roots back to the Persian-influenced Aramaic of the Arsacid Empire. Modern Mandaic is spoken fluently by about 6,000 people.

Speakers

The number of modern speakers of Neo-Aramaic languages is estimated from approximately 575,000 to 1,000,000, the vast majority of whom are Assyrian people. The largest of subgroups of speakers are Assyrian Neo-Aramaic with approximately 500,000 speakers, Chaldean Neo-Aramaic with approximately 240,000 speakers, Turoyo (Surayt) with approximately 100,000 speakers and a few thousand speakers of other Neo-Aramaic languages (i.e. Modern Judeo-Aramaic varieties and Bohtan Neo-Aramaic, among others), which give a total of over 870,000 Neo-Aramaic speakers.

See also

References

Sources 

 
 
 
 
 
 
 
 
 
 
 
 
 
 
 
 
 
 
 
 
 
 
  
 
 
 
 
 
 
 

 
 
 
 
 
Waltisberg, Michael (2016). Syntax des Ṭuroyo (= Semitica Viva 55). Wiesbaden: Otto Harrassowitz Verlag. .

External links

 Helen Younansardaroud: Bibliographie zu neuaramäischen Dialekten
 Aramaic Dictionary – search the online dictionary using English or Aramaic words, including many other options.
 Sureth – French/English Dictionary

 
Languages of Iraq
Languages of Iran
Languages of Turkey